Torhthelm was a medieval Bishop of Leicester.

Torhthelm was consecrated in 737. He died in 764.

Citations

References

External links
 

Bishops of Leicester (ancient)
764 deaths
Year of birth unknown
8th-century English bishops